Larry Banner (June 6, 1936 – November 28, 2013) was an American gymnast. He competed at the 1960 Summer Olympics and the 1964 Summer Olympics.

References

External links
 

1936 births
2013 deaths
American male artistic gymnasts
Olympic gymnasts of the United States
Gymnasts at the 1960 Summer Olympics
Gymnasts at the 1964 Summer Olympics
Gymnasts from Los Angeles